The 2015 season is Buriram United's fourth season in the Thai Premier League. The club enters the season as the TPL Champion, and will participate in the Thai Premier League, FA Cup, League Cup, Kor Royal Cup and the AFC Champions League. The season covers the period from 20 December 2014 to 26 December 2015.

This is Buriram United's name changing.
 1970-2009 as Provincial Electricity Authority Football Club (PEA)
 2010-2011 as Buriram Provincial Electricity Authority Football Club (Buriram PEA)
 2012–present as Buriram United Football Club (Buriram United)

Players

Squad information, appearances and goals

Top scorers

Transfers
First Thai footballer's market is opening on 6 November 2014 to 28 January 2015

Second Thai footballer's market is opening on 3 June 2015 to 30 June 2015

Transfers in

Transfers out

Loans out

Non-competitive

Pre-season and friendlies

Competitions

Overview

{| class="wikitable" style="text-align: center"
|-
!rowspan=2|Competition
!colspan=8|Record
|-
!
!
!
!
!
!
!
!
|-
| Thai Premier League

|-
| Kor Royal Cup

|-
| FA Cup

|-
| League Cup

|-
| Champions League

|-
| Mekong Club Championship

|-
! Total

Kor Royal Cup

It's a match between the 2014 Toyota Thai Premier League's champions (Buriram United) and the 2014 Thaicom FA Cup's champions (Bangkok Glass). The match was held at Suphachalasai Stadium, Bangkok.

Thai Premier League

League table

Results summary

Results by matchday

Results by opponent

Matches

Thai FA Cup

Thai League Cup

Mekong Club Championship

AFC Champions League

Group stage

Buriram United was staying on group F, with  Gamba Osaka from Japan,  Seongnam from South Korea and  Guangzhou R&F from China.

See also
List of unbeaten football club seasons

References

Bur
2015